Norman Edwin "Ned" Vincent (3 March 1909 – 1980) was an English professional footballer who played as a full-back in the Football League for Stockport County| and Grimsby Town.

References

1909 births
1980 deaths
People from Prudhoe
Footballers from Northumberland
English footballers
Association football fullbacks
Prudhoe United F.C. players
Spennymoor United F.C. players
Stockport County F.C. players
Grimsby Town F.C. players
Stalybridge Celtic F.C. players
English Football League players